Deh Ful (also Romanized as Deh Fūl and Dehfūl) is a village in Tariq ol Eslam Rural District, in the Central District of Nahavand County, Hamadan Province, Iran. At the 2006 census, its population was 2,582, in 737 families.

References 

Populated places in Nahavand County